Dreams of Sanity was a gothic metal band from Austria. Founded in 1991, they released three full-length albums, before disbanding in 2002.

History
After forming in 1991, Dreams of Sanity released two demos in 1994 and 1996. They toured Europe late in 1996 before releasing their proper debut in 1997, which was inspired by The Divine Comedy of Dante Alighieri. Two further full-lengths were issued by the band, the first based upon Phantom of the Opera and the second exploring the concept of life as a game. The group went through a series of lineup changes around the recording of the third album. Following this they were dropped by their label Hall of Sermon; the group broke up in 2002.

Members

Final line-up
 Michael Knoflach - bass (1991-2002)
 Christian K. Marx - guitars (1991-2002)
 Andreas Wildauer - guitars (1994-2002)
 Sandra Schleret - lead vocals (1994-2000, 2001-2002)
 Patrick Schrittwieser - drums (1999-2002)
 Florian Steiner - keyboards (2000-2002)

Session & Touring members
 Laura Angelmayer - vocals (1993)
 Tilo Wolff - male vocals (1999)
 Jan Peter - guitars (1999-2000)

Former members
 Hannes Richter - drums (1991-1993)
 Florian Ratzesberger	- keyboards (1992-1993), Guitars (1993-1994)
 Gudrun Gfrerer - lead vocals (1992-1993)
 Romed Astner	- drums (1993-1997)
 Stefan Manges	- keyboards (1993-1997)
 Robert - lead vocals (1993-1994)
 Birgit Moser - lead vocals (1993-1994)
 Martina Hornbacher - vocals (1994-1997)
 Harald Obexer	- drums (1997-1999)
 Frédéric Heil	- keyboards (1997-2000)
 Barbara Peer	- vocals (2000-2001)

Timeline

Discography

Demos
 Demo (1994)
 A God Damned City (demo compilation CD, 1995)
 Ein Liebeslied (demo, 1996)

Studio albums
 Komödia (Hall of Sermon, 1997)
 Masquerade (Hall of Sermon, 1999)
 The Game (Hall of Sermon, 2000)

Singles
 Window to the Sky (2000)

Videos
 (1999) Blade of Doom (Live in Mexico)
 (1999) The Maiden and the River (Live in Mexico)
 (1999) Treesitter (Live in Mexico)

References

Musical groups established in 1991
Musical groups disestablished in 2002
Austrian heavy metal musical groups
Austrian symphonic metal musical groups
1991 establishments in Austria